Chemillé-Melay was a short-lived commune in the department of Maine-et-Loire in western France. 

The commune was established on 1 January 2013 by merger of the former communes of Chemillé and Melay. On 15 December 2015, Chanzeaux, La Chapelle-Rousselin, Chemillé-Melay, Cossé-d'Anjou, La Jumellière, Neuvy-en-Mauges, Sainte-Christine, Saint-Georges-des-Gardes, Saint-Lézin, La Salle-de-Vihiers, La Tourlandry, and Valanjou merged becoming one commune called Chemillé-en-Anjou.

References

See also 
Communes of the Maine-et-Loire department

Former communes of Maine-et-Loire
Populated places established in 2013
2013 establishments in France
Populated places disestablished in 2015